The American West Conference (AWC) was a college athletic conference in the United States from 1993 to 1996.  It consisted of schools in California and Utah.  The charter members of the conference were California Polytechnic State University; California State University, Northridge; California State University, Sacramento; the University of California, Davis; and Southern Utah University.

The conference comprised schools from the old Western Football Conference that had recently made the move from NCAA Division II to NCAA Division I. The conference was founded on July 15, 1993, as an NCAA Division I-AA football-only conference. It added additional sports a year later.  The members were prompted to move their programs in response to an NCAA ruling barring member institutions from competing in football at a lower level than other sports.

The only commissioner of the American West Conference was Vic Buccola, who had been the athletic director at Cal Poly from 1973 to 1981, and commissioner of the Western Football Conference from 1981 to 1992.

History

1993–94: I-AA football only
UC Davis and Southern Utah tied for the 1993 AWC football championship with 3–1 records. Although UC Davis was a conference member, the team was listed in Division II polls, and participated in the Division II postseason.

1994–95
UC Davis left the AWC after the 1993 season, leaving Cal Poly San Luis Obispo, Cal State Northridge, Sacramento State, Southern Utah for the 1994–95 season.   In the 1994–95 season, the AWC sponsored men's and women's cross country, men's and women's basketball, men's and women's track and field, and women's tennis, in addition to football.  The AWC did not have an automatic bid to the NCAA championships since the NCAA requires a conference to have six teams.

Cal Poly San Luis Obispo won the 1994 AWC football championship.

1995–96
The 1995–96 season was the last season of the AWC.  Cal Poly accepted an invitation to the Big West Conference.  Cal State Northridge and Sacramento State accepted invitations to the Big Sky Conference.  Southern Utah became an independent until they became members of the Mid-Continent Conference, now called the Summit League, in 1997.

By winning the 400 Meter Intermediate Hurdle championship races in both 1995 and 1996, David Baeza became the only Men's 400IH American West Conference Champion in history.  He also won the 1996 400m Dash Championship race after finishing 3rd in the 1995 championship race.

Aftermath
Cal State Northridge left the Big Sky for the Big West in 2001. That year, they operated as a I-AA independent in football, and in 2002 their football program was dropped.

UC Davis made the decision to move up to Division I in 2003, and in 2007 they joined Cal State Northridge and Cal Poly in the Big West.

Former AWC members UC Davis, Cal Poly, and Southern Utah would later found the Great West Football Conference (later renamed the Great West Conference), along with newcomers Northern Colorado, North Dakota State, and South Dakota State from the North Central Conference, as a home for their football programs at the I-AA level in 2004. This conference remained small much like the AWC for its entire existence, ranging from only 5 to 6 football members at any given time. In late 2010, the Big Sky Conference announced it would add UC Davis and Cal Poly as football-only members, as well as Southern Utah as a full member, thus reuniting these schools with Sacramento State in football. This move effectively dissolved the Great West as a football-sponsoring conference.

Timeline

Champions

Men's basketball

Regular season
1995 Southern Utah
1996 Cal Poly

Conference tournament
1995 Southern Utah
1996 Southern Utah

Men's Track & Field

400m
1996 David Baeza - Cal Poly

400IH
1995 David Baeza - Cal Poly

1996 David Baeza - Cal Poly

Football standings

References
 1995 Cal State Northridge football media guide, p. 32

 
Sports in the Western United States
Defunct NCAA Division I conferences
Sports leagues established in 1993
Sports leagues disestablished in 1996
Articles which contain graphical timelines
1993 establishments in the United States
1996 disestablishments in the United States